List of active Pakistan Navy ships is a list of ships, submarines, and other watercraft currently in service with the Pakistan Navy.

Submarine fleet

Conventional-powered attack submarines

Midget submarines

Surface fleet

Frigates

Corvettes

Missile boats

Fast patrol crafts & High speed boats

Auxiliary fleet

Replenishment ships

Research & survey vessels

Mine countermeasure vessels

Support ships

Training vessels

Miscellaneous

See also
 Pakistan Maritime Security Agency (a Navy with 23 corvettes and patrol craft) 
 Pakistan Coast Guards (a Army branch with some patrol boats)  
 Karachi Naval Dockyard
 Currently active military equipment by country

References

External links 
 Pakistan Navy Official Site

 
Pakistan
Navy, ships, active
Navy